Scientific Protein Laboratories is a bio-pharmaceutical company established in Waunakee, Wisconsin in 1976 by Oscar Mayer.

History
In 2004 SPL was acquired by Arsenal Capital Partners for $81 million, today. In 2014 it was acquired by the Chinese company Shenzhen Hepalink Pharmaceutical. The company was a victim, along with other pharmaceutical companies, of the 2008 Chinese heparin adulteration.

The company harvests heparin from pig's intestines in the United States and Canada and Changzhou City, China and supplies the crude heparin to Baxter Travenol and other pharmaceutical companies throughout the world.

References

External links

1976 establishments in Wisconsin
Dane County, Wisconsin
Companies based in Wisconsin
Biotechnology companies established in 1976